Jean-Pierre Dick (born 8 October 1965 in Nice) is a French professional yachtsman.

Biography
Jean-Pierre Dick is the third of four children, his father (Pierre-Richard Dick, founder of Virbac Laboratories). He is trained as a veterinary doctor but his passion is for the sea and he has been offshore racing since 1989.

Sailing career
His professional sailing career has been focused on Offshore sailing. He has had most success double handed sailing including wins int Transat Jacques-Vabre in 2003, 2005, 2011 and 2017  and the Barcelona World Race in 2008 and 2011.

He has competed in the solo round the world Vendée Globe, four times finish three of them with a best position of 4th after. It was the in 2012 Vendee Globe having long been in the top three that he lost the keel between the Cape Verde Islands and the Azores caused him to lose all hope of a podium, but he managed the by a feat of seamanship to finish the race by covering 2,643 miles without a keel.

In 2014 he embarked on a new world tour project: St Michel-Virbac, the name of the new boat of the Azure skipper designed by Verdier / VPLP. St Michel-Virbac competed in the IMOCA Ocean Masters Championships from 2015 to 2017, culminating in the 2016–2017 Vendée Globe, of which he takes fourth place, before following a fourth victory at the end of 2017 on the Transat Jacques Vabre, with Yann Eliès, who became the helm of virbac, confident his desire to "move on". With his company Absolute Dreamer, he is developing a new flying boat the ETF26, creating a new circuit. He also campaigned a MOD 70 trimaran which he capsized during training.

Race Result Highlights

Round the World Races

4th 2016–2017 Vendée Globe
4th 2012–2013 Vendée Globe
RET 2008–2009 Vendée Globe following a collision with a growler off the coast of New Zealand.
6th 2004–2005 Vendée Globe
1st 2011 Barcelona World Race with Loïck Peyronon Virbac Paprec 3
1st 2008 Barcelona World Race with Damian Foxall

Other IMOCA 60 Events

3rd – 2006 Route du Rhum 
4th – 2010 Route du Rhum

2nd – 2005 Rolex Fastnet Race – IMOCA 60 Class
3rd – 2005 Calais Round Britain Race

Other Event
1st 2020 Atlantic Rally for Cruiser – Racing Division done two handed with Fabrice Renouard 
1st 2019 Atlantic Rally for Cruiser – Racing Division 
1st 2018 Atlantic Rally for Cruiser – Racing Division 
1st 2001 Tour de France à la voile – Farr 30
1st 1992 Tour de France à la voile with Jimmy Pahun – JOD 35

1st 2001 Spi Ouest France
1st 1995 Spi Ouest France
1st 1994 Spi Ouest France
1st 1992 Spi Ouest France
1st 1989 Spi Ouest France

Gallery

References

External links 
 
 

1965 births
Living people
Sportspeople from Nice
Farr 30 class sailors
IMOCA 60 class sailors
French male sailors (sport)
Vendée Globe finishers
2004 Vendee Globe sailors
2008 Vendee Globe sailors
2012 Vendee Globe sailors
2016 Vendee Globe sailors
French Vendee Globe sailors
Single-handed circumnavigating sailors